Dune is the eleventh album by Klaus Schulze. It was originally released in 1979, and in 2005 was the tenth Schulze album reissued by Revisited Records. "Shadows of Ignorance" features Arthur Brown on vocals, half-singing/half-chanting a long poem written by Schulze.

The cover photograph was taken by Schulze himself, who arranged black letters on a television screen and took a snapshot during a scene of the Soviet science fiction film Solaris.

Track listing
All tracks composed by Klaus Schulze.

Personnel
 Klaus Schulze – electronics
 Arthur Brown – vocals (on "Shadows of Ignorance")
 Wolfgang Tiepold – cello

References

External links
 Dune at the official site of Klaus Schulze
 

Klaus Schulze albums
1979 albums